Richard F. Harp (March 28, 1918 – March 18, 2000) was an American college basketball coach who spent the majority of his career at the University of Kansas. He became the Kansas Jayhawks' fourth men's basketball coach in 1956. He coached for eight years until his resignation in 1964. Harp's overall Kansas record was 121–82 (.596) and conference record was 63–45 (.583).

Harp played high school basketball at Rosedale High School before being recruited by Phog Allen to play for Kansas. After gaining a wealth of knowledge as a player and assistant under Allen, Harp became the Jayhawks' head coach himself from 1956–1964. Harp compiled a 121–82 record in those eight seasons and led the Jayhawks to two conference titles (one Big Seven, one Big Eight Conference) and two NCAA tournament berths. In 1957, the Jayhawks captured the Midwest Regional and made it to the finals, only to be stopped by the University of North Carolina in a memorable 54–53 loss in triple overtime in Kansas City, Mo. Under his guidance, Wilt Chamberlain and Bill Bridges achieved All-American status. Chamberlain's relationship with Harp, however, was notably poor, fueled by resentment and disappointment: Chamberlain's biographer, Robert Cherry, has speculated that Chamberlain would not have chosen to attend Kansas if he had known that Harp's predecessor, Phog Allen, was going to retire in 1956.

Harp had served as Phog Allen's assistant for eight seasons before taking over for Allen in 1956. Prior to that Harp was head coach for two seasons at William Jewell College in Liberty, Missouri. Harp played basketball at KU, lettering from 1938–1940 and was one of the starting guards on the 1940 team that lost to Indiana University in the NCAA finals. Harp served as master sergant in the US Army for four years during World War II. Harp served as the director of the Fellowship of Christian Athletes for 13 years after leaving the Jayhawks. Harp is one of only five people to have played and coached in an NCAA title game. He served as an assistant coach from 1986–1989 at North Carolina for Dean Smith – whom he coached as a player at Kansas when he was Allen's assistant.

Coach Harp lived in Lawrence, Kansas until his death in March 2000. Harp's health had been failing for several years and he had recently fractured a hip. He died at his residence at Lawrence's Presbyterian Manor. He was survived by his wife of 56 years, Martha Sue (d. 2009), and a son, Richard Layne Harp, of Las Vegas.

Head coaching record

See also
 List of NCAA Division I Men's Final Four appearances by coach

References

Further reading
Rock Chalk Zone
UNC athletic department

1918 births
2000 deaths
American men's basketball coaches
Kansas Jayhawks men's basketball coaches
Kansas Jayhawks men's basketball players
North Carolina Tar Heels men's basketball coaches
William Jewell Cardinals men's basketball coaches
College men's basketball head coaches in the United States
American men's basketball players